Des Pardes (Punjabi is a 1983 Pakistani, drama, action and musical film, Cinema of Pakistan, directed by Iftikhar Khan and produced by Zulfiqar Ali Khan. starring Sultan Rahi in the lead role and with Aasia and Afzaal Ahmed. Also in the villain role Mustafa Qureshi as Jakpal.

Cast
 Sultan Rahi – Babar
 Aasia – Rano
 Mustafa Qureshi – Jakpal
 Chakori – Miss Rita
 Afzal Ahmed – Tariq
 Bahar – Babar (Mother)
 Tariq Javed – London Seth
 Aliya Begum – 
 Shagufta
 Iqbal Durrani
 Rehan
 Piya
 Changezi
 Badal
 Khawar Abbas
 Asif Qureshi
 Ilyas Kashmiri

Track list
Music of this film is composed by Tafoo, film song lyrics are by Khawaja Pervez

References

Extrrnal links 
 

Pakistani biographical films
Pakistani action drama films
1980s Punjabi-language films
1983 films
Punjabi-language Pakistani films